Moviecam SL (SL stands for SuperLight) is a movie camera product line created by Moviecam in 1996. It is a lighter version of Moviecam Compact. It can use most of the same accessories as Moviecam Compact but allows for even easier shooting from the shoulder or with a support like Steadicam systems.

In 2004, Moviecam released SL MK2, with updated drive system, support of 3 perforations negative pulldown and new electronics.

See also
 Moviecam
 Moviecam Compact

External links
 Moviecam SL
 Moviecam SL MK2

Movie cameras
Cameras introduced in 1996